Abdurrahman Sami Pasha (1794–1882) was an Ottoman bureaucrat, statesman, and one of the founders of the Senate. He was also the first Minister of Education.

References 

1794 births
1882 deaths
Political people from the Ottoman Empire
Education ministers